Starr and Company was a BBC television drama series aired in 1958. It was a soap opera, aired two times a week, Monday and Thursday. 77 episodes were made, of which only a single episode (episode 1) is known to survive.

Most of the cast were not known before or after, but there were several well-known players –
– either already established or later became well-known.

In those times, all programmes were live, there were no telerecordings, no repeats – any repeat was another live programme, sometimes with changes of cast.

Episodes

References

External links

1950s British television soap operas
1958 British television series debuts
1958 British television series endings
BBC television dramas
Black-and-white British television shows
British television soap operas
English-language television shows
Lost BBC episodes